Albania participated in the Eurovision Song Contest 2005 in Kyiv, Ukraine, with the song "Tomorrow I Go" performed by Ledina Çelo. Its selected entry was chosen through the national selection competition Festivali i Këngës organised by Radio Televizioni Shqiptar (RTSH) in December 2004. Due to the top 10 result in the previous contest, the nation automatically qualified for the grand final, which took place on 21 May 2005. In the final, it performed as number eight and placed 16th out of the 24 participating countries, scoring 53 points.

Background 

Therefore, the country's national broadcaster, Radio Televizioni Shqiptar (RTSH), chose the annual competition Festivali i Këngës as the selection method to determine Albania's representative for the contest. The first entry was performed by Anjeza Shahini with the song "The Image of You" which finished in seventh place at the Eurovision Song Contest 2004.

Before Eurovision

Festivali i Këngës 

RTSH organised the 43rd edition of Festivali i Këngës to determine Albania's representative for the Eurovision Song Contest 2005. The competition consisted of two semi-finals on 16 and 17 December, respectively, and the grand final on 18 December 2004. The three live shows were hosted by Albanian-Sudanese singer Hueyda El Sayed and presenter Leon Menkshi. Guest performances were featured from Albania's Eurovision Song Contest 2004 representative Anjeza Shahini, Italy's Eurovision Song Contest 1988 representative Luca Barbarossa and the winner of the Eurovision Song Contest 2004 Ruslana from Ukraine.

Competing entries

Shows

Semi-finals 

The semi-finals of Festivali i Këngës took place on 16 December and 17 December 2004, respectively. 16 contestants participated in each semi-final, with the highlighted ones progressing to the grand final.

Final 
The grand final of Festivali i Këngës took place on 18 December 2004. Ledina Çelo emerged as the winner with "Nesër shkoj" and was simultaneously announced as Albania's representative for the Eurovision Song Contest 2005.

Key:
 Winner
 Second place
 Third place

At Eurovision 

The Eurovision Song Contest 2005 took place at the Palace of Sports in Kyiv, Ukraine, and consisted of a semi-final on 19 May and the grand final on 21 May 2005. Due to the top 11 result in the previous year, Albania automatically qualified for the contest's grand final and performed eighth, following  and preceding .

Voting 

The tables below visualise a breakdown of points awarded to Albania in the grand final of the Eurovision Song Contest 2005, as well as by the nation in the semi-final and final, respectively. The nation awarded its 12 points to Macedonia in the semi-final and to Greece in the grand final of the contest.

Points awarded to Albania

Points awarded by Albania

References 

2005
Countries in the Eurovision Song Contest 2005
2004
Eurovision